Murrod or Myrod (Middle Persian: Murrōd, New Persian: مورود) was a 3rd-century Sasanian queen (banbishn), the wife of the Sasanian king (shah) Ardashir I and mother of Sasanian king Shapur I. She is mentioned in the inscription of Shapur I on the wall of the Ka'ba-ye Zartosht at Naqsh-e Rostam near Persepolis in southern Iran as “Lady Murrod, Mother of the King of Kings”. According to a legend she was a Parthian princess and a daughter of Artabanus IV of Parthia.

References

Sources 
 
 

3rd-century Iranian people
3rd-century deaths
Sasanian queens
3rd-century women
Parthian princesses